FC Gintra is a Lithuanian women's football club from Šiauliai. It is the team of the local Šiauliai University.

History
The club plays in the highest Lithuanian league, the A Lyga and has won 13 championships so far. The fourth one in 2005 and every championship since then.

After its championships, the club played in the UEFA Women's Cup and from 2009 onwards in the UEFA Women's Champions League. The club participated only in the qualifying rounds though, playing 3 games each season, and the best result achieved was 1 win, 1 tie and 1 loss thus failing to move on to the next round.

The club took part in the  2010–11 UEFA Women's Champions League qualifying round and managed a good 2nd place after beating ZFK Borec (Macedonia), drawing to Klaksvikar Itrottarfelag (Faroe Islands) and only losing to England's Everton. All games were hosted by Gintra in Lithuania. In the 2014/15 edition they finished as best runners-up and advanced to the round of 32 for the first time in ten seasons.

Honours
 A Lyga (20): 1999, 2000, 2003, 2005 to 2021
 Lithuanian Women's Cup (12) : 2005 to 2016
 Lithuanian Women's Supercup (1) : 2006
 Baltic League (1): 2017

Players

Current squad

Former internationals
  Lithuania: Raimonda Bložytė-Lukoševičienė, Viktorija Budrytė, Gintare Burokaitė, Oksana Imanalijeva, Rasa Imanalijeva, Rasa Jackunaitė, Gitana Kerpiėnė, Indrė Kirjanovaitė, Raimonda Kudytė, Rimantė Kunickaitė, Anika Kyžaitė, Justina Lavrenovaitė-Perez, Jurgita Mačikunytė, Rita Mažukėlytė, Brigita Partikaitė, Alina Petrauskaitė, Klaudija Savickaitė, Marija Stasiulytė, Olga Švaikevič, Kamilė Vaičiulaitytė, Liucija Vaitukaitytė, Tatjana Veržbickaja, Dovilė Gailevičiūtė, Simona Petravičienė, Algimantė Mikutaitė, Greta Lukjančukė, Vestina Neverdauskaitė, Meda Šeškutė, Paulina Sarkanaitė, Gabija Toropovaitė, Rimantė Jonušaitė, Meda Šeškutė, Lolita Žižytė, Samanta Karasiovaitė, Paulina Sarkanaitė
  Azerbaijan: Ina Boyko, Narmina Rzayeva
  Belarus: Lyubov Gudchenko, Anna Pilipenko
  Bulgaria: Kristina Petrunova
  Chile: María José Rojas
  Equatorial Guinea: Laetitia Chapeh, Gloria Chinasa
  Jamaica: Toriana Patterson
  Latvia: Guna Āboliņa, Sintija Greijere, Olga Ivanova, Ņina Maksimova, Karlīna Miksone, Anastasija Ročāne
  Mexico: Christina Murillo
  Moldova: Ina Budestean, Carolina Țabur, Elena Turcan
  Namibia: Zenatha Coleman
  Nigeria: Florence Ajayi
  Serbia: Jelena Čubrilo, Nikoleta Nikolić
  South Africa: Jermaine Seoposenwe, Leandra Smeda, Nothando Vilakazi
  Thailand: Miranda Nild
  Ukraine: Anastasia Filenko, Tetyana Kozyrenko

Record in UEFA competitions

Notes

References

External links
Club at UEFA.com

Women's football clubs in Lithuania
Šiauliai University
Sport in Šiauliai